Synalocha gutierreziae is a species of moth of the family Tortricidae. It is found in the United States in Texas, Arizona and New Mexico.

The length of the forewings is about 6.5-7.9 mm for males and 6.5-10.5 mm for females. There is shining, pale-tan scaling on the forewings. There is dark grey-brown scaling on the hindwings. Females appear too heavy to fly. Adult males are on wing in October and November. There are multiple generations per year.

The larvae have been recorded feeding on Gutierrezia sarothrae and Gutierrezia microcephalum. Pupation occurs in tied leaves of their host plant.

References

Moths described in 1985
Sparganothini